is a 22-episode anime television series mecha series that aired in Japan in 1984. It revolves around criminals using robots to save innocents in exchange for years being cut from their long prison sentences. The program did not fare very well and had its planned number of episodes cut due to the bankruptcy of the its sponsor, Takatoku Toys. A 23rd episode was partially completed but did not air. Episode 22 was a typical episode but had a 35-second epilogue tacked onto the end that explained the series' planned outcome via voice-over narration and stills. This series was also one of the last to be animated by the studio Kokusai Eiga-sha.

Story
In the 23rd century, billionaire Rei Midoriyama creates a secret organization called Circus to combat a hidden group called Shadow that is taking over the world. When she can't find qualified pilots for Circus' main mecha, the Galvion, she cuts a deal with two convicts, Mu and Maya, to lead the fight against Shadow.

Characters
 Mu (voice actor: Kouichi Hashimoto);
 Maya (voice actor: Hirotaka Suzuoki);
 Inka (voice actor: Yukiko Nashiwa);
 Rei Midoriyama (voice actor: Keiko Yokozawa);
 Henry McMillan (voice actor: Kenyuu Horiuchi);

Mecha
 Circus-1 Galvion
 Circus-1
 Road Attacker
 Circus-2
 Circus-3 Xector
 Circus-3
 Kyoukou Keitai
 Excalibur
 Road Machine
 Road Fighter
 Goblin
 Road Machine
 Road Fighter
 Road Chaser
 Breast Chaser
 Atomic Chaser
 Rescue Chaser
 MB-α3 Videus
 MB-α4 Ragdoll
 MB-α7 Lias
 MB-α10 Golem
 MB-α11 Vargas
 MB-α12 Brian

References

External links
 
 Galvion at Gears Online

1984 anime television series debuts
1980s toys
Mecha anime and manga
TV Asahi original programming